The 2009 GP2 Series season was the forty-third season of the second-tier of Formula One feeder championship and also fifth season under the GP2 Series moniker. The season consisted of twenty races at ten rounds, beginning on 9 May at the Circuit de Catalunya and finishing on 20 September at the Autódromo Internacional do Algarve. The Algarve circuit hosted its first GP2 weekend, and was the only new circuit on the calendar. The Nürburgring also returned as part of its rotation with Hockenheim as the home of the German Grand Prix.

The title was won by German rookie Nico Hülkenberg at the penultimate round of the championship at Monza, the first time the series had been won before the final round. His team ART Grand Prix claimed the teams title in the Algarve.

Barwa Addax's title contender Romain Grosjean left the series mid-season to join the Renault for the remainder of the Formula One season following Nelson Piquet Jr.'s sacking.

Champion Hülkenberg, runner-up Petrov and 3rd place Lucas di Grassi all drove in the 2010 Formula One season for Williams, Renault and new team Virgin Racing respectively. 16th place Kamui Kobayashi took part in the final two races of the 2009 Formula One season for Toyota following Timo Glock's injury in the Japanese Grand Prix while 18th place Karun Chandhok joined new Formula One team HRT in 2010.

Teams and drivers
All of the teams used the Dallara GP2/08 chassis with Renault-badged 4.0 litre (244 cu in) naturally-aspirated Mecachrome V8 engines order and with tyres supplied by Bridgestone.

Team changes
 BCN Competición was bought by Tiago Monteiro, who moved the team to Portugal and renamed it Ocean Racing Technology.
 Campos Grand Prix became Barwa Addax after it was bought by Alejandro Agag.
 Midseason changes
 Fisichella Motor Sport became PartyPokerRacing.com Scuderia Coloni prior to round seven in Valencia. They were then forced to miss round eight at Spa due to unresolved financial disputes.
 Durango missed round nine at Monza as Stefano Coletti destroyed one of the team's chassis in a crash at Spa. Coletti himself was unfit to drive the original chassis that was formerly driven by Nelson Panciatici. They also missed the final round at the Autódromo Internacional do Algarve due to not finding "suitably qualified drivers".

Driver changes
 Changed Teams
 Karun Chandhok: iSport International → Ocean Racing Technology
 Lucas di Grassi: Campos Grand Prix → Fat Burner Racing Engineering
 Luca Filippi: Trust Team Arden → Super Nova Racing
 Romain Grosjean: ART Grand Prix → Barwa Addax Team
 Pastor Maldonado: Minardi Piquet Sports → ART Grand Prix
 Diego Nunes: David Price Racing → iSport International
 Álvaro Parente: Super Nova Racing → Ocean Racing Technology
 Roldán Rodríguez: Fisichella Motor Sport → Piquet GP
 Alberto Valerio: Durango → Piquet GP
 Davide Valsecchi: Durango → Barwa Addax
 Javier Villa : Racing Engineering → Super Nova Racing
 Andreas Zuber: Minardi Piquet Sports → Fisichella Motor Sport/PartyPokerRacing.com Scuderia Coloni

 Entering/Re-Entering GP2
 Johnny Cecotto Jr.: Formula 3 Euro Series (HBR Motorsport) → David Price Racing
 Dani Clos: Formula 3 Euro Series (Prema Powerteam) → Fat Burner Racing Engineering
 Stefano Coletti: Formula 3 Euro Series (Prema Powerteam) → Durango
 Giedo van der Garde: World Series by Renault (P1 Motorsport) → iSport International
 Rodolfo González: Formula 3 Euro Series (Carlin Motorsport) → Trident Racing
 Nico Hülkenberg: Formula 3 Euro Series (ART Grand Prix) → ART Grand Prix
 Edoardo Mortara: Formula 3 Euro Series (Signature-Plus) → Telmex Arden International
 Nelson Panciatici: Spanish Formula Three Championship (Hache International) → Durango
 Franck Perera: Superleague Formula (A.S. Roma) → David Price Racing
 Sergio Pérez: British Formula 3 Championship (T-Sport) → Telmex Arden International
 Luiz Razia: Euroseries 3000 (ELK Motorsport) → Fisichella Motor Sport/PartyPokerRacing.com Scuderia Coloni
 Davide Rigon: Superleague Formula (Beijing Guoan) → Trident Racing
 Ricardo Teixeira: British Formula 3 Championship (Ultimate Motorsport) → Trident Racing

 Leaving GP2
 Marko Asmer: Fisichella Motor Sport → Superleague Formula testing
 Christian Bakkerud: Super Nova Racing → Deutsche Tourenwagen Masters (Futurecom-TME)
 Sébastien Buemi: Trust Team Arden → Formula One (Scuderia Toro Rosso)
 Mike Conway: Trident Racing → IndyCar Series (Dreyer & Reinbold Racing)
 Romain Grosjean: ART Grand Prix → Formula One (ING Renault F1 Team)
 Carlos Iaconelli: BCN Competición → FIA Formula Two Championship
 Giorgio Pantano: Racing Engineering → Eurocup Renault Mégane V6 Trophy & Superleague Formula (A.C. Milan)
 Miloš Pavlović: BCN Competición → FIA Formula Two Championship
 Bruno Senna: iSport International → Le Mans Series (Team Oreca Matmut AIM)
 Andy Soucek: Super Nova Racing → FIA Formula Two Championship
 Ho-Pin Tung: Trident Racing → A1 Grand Prix (A1 Team China) & Superleague Formula (Atlético Madrid)
 Adrián Vallés: BCN Competición → World Series by Renault (Epsilon Euskadi) & Superleague Formula (Liverpool F.C.)

 Midseason changes
 Giacomo Ricci was replaced at DPR by Franck Perera after round four. Perera parted company with DPR prior to round nine to return to A.S. Roma in Superleague Formula. Perera was in turn replaced by Venezuelan driver Johnny Cecotto Jr. for the final two rounds.
 Davide Rigon missed round five due to sponsorship problems. Rodolfo González filled in for him at Trident Racing.
 Davide Valsecchi parted company with Durango ahead of round seven and switched to Barwa Addax to replace Formula One-bound Romain Grosjean. Stefano Coletti was the driver to replace Valsecchi at Durango.

2009 schedule
The 2009 calendar was announced on 16 December 2008. The final round of the championship will be the first GP2 race to take place at the Autódromo Internacional do Algarve. Also, the German Grand Prix was moved from Hockenheim to the Nürburgring.

Results

Championship standings
Scoring system
Points are awarded to the top 8 classified finishers in the Feature race, and to the top 6 classified finishers in the Sprint race. The pole-sitter in the feature race will also receive two points, and one point is given to the driver who set the fastest lap inside the top ten in both the feature and sprint races. No extra points are awarded to the pole-sitter in the sprint race.

Feature race points

Sprint race points
Points are awarded to the top 6 classified finishers.

Drivers' Championship

Notes:
† — Drivers did not finish the race, but were classified as they completed over 90% of the race distance.

Teams' Championship

Notes:
† — Drivers did not finish the race, but were classified as they completed over 90% of the race distance.

Notes

References

External links

 GP2 Series official website
 GP2 Series official blog

GP2 Series season 2009
GP2 Series seasons
GP2 Series